Cătălin Grigore (born 6 October 1977) is a Romanian former football player. He played as a goalkeeper for teams such as: Petrolul Ploiești, Zimbru Chișinău or Politehnica Timișoara, among others.

Club career

He made his debut in the Divizia A at 19 for Chindia Târgovişte where he played until the 1999/2000 season.

His next destination was Petrolul Ploieşti where he did not make a great impact. After playing in 11 matches in his first season at the club, he lost his starting position.

In 2003, he moved to FCU Politehnica. His first year there brought him praise as a good goalkeeper, but as his performances during the next season were unconvincing, youngster Eduard Cristian Zimmermann replaced him. Since Marius Popa arrived at the club, Grigore has not been featured in any first division match. His subsequent move to Unirea is a consequence of this.

On 30 August 2010 he signed a two-year contract with Astra Ploieşti coming as a free agent following the financial problems involving the former Romanian champions.

Honours 
Zimbru Chișinău
 Cupa Moldovei: 2002–03

Unirea Urziceni
Liga I: 2008–09
Cupa României runner-up: 2007–08

References

External links
 
 

1977 births
Living people
People from Dâmbovița County
Romanian footballers
Liga I players
Liga II players
Liga III players
Association football goalkeepers
FCM Târgoviște players
FC Politehnica Timișoara players
FC Unirea Urziceni players
FC CFR Timișoara players
FC Zimbru Chișinău players
Moldovan Super Liga players
Romanian expatriate footballers
Expatriate footballers in Moldova
FC Petrolul Ploiești players
FC Astra Giurgiu players
Romanian expatriate sportspeople in Moldova